Sargis Aleksanyan (born 30 November 1983), is an Armenian politician, Member of the National Assembly of Armenia of Bright Armenia's faction.

References 

1983 births
Living people
21st-century Armenian politicians